The Club Quarters Hotel is a 16-story,  Beaux-Arts high-rise at 710 Fannin Street in downtown Houston, Texas, United States. The building is listed on the National Register of Historic Places as the Texas State Hotel.

History

Site
The Texas State Hotel is located at 720 Fannin, at the corner of Fannin and Rusk in downtown Houston. As recently as 2007, it shared Block 80 with the Kress Building (1913), the Houston Bar Center, and the Kirby Building. This last two buildings have been modified with modern slipcovers. The 2008 NRHP nomination form reported eleven buildings within a block of the Texas State Hotel which predated World War II. The predominant land use of Block 80 was originally residential. The First Baptist Church once occupied the Texas State Hotel site, a neighborhood church 
which was built in 1883 and occupied through 1905. One commercial building was located on Block 80 in the late-nineteenth century, with two large houses situated on large lots with outbuildings. One of these houses had an address on Rusk Street, the other on Capitol street. They persisted through 1924, even as Main Street hosted extensive commercial development. Block 80 consisted completely of commercial development after 1924. The First Baptist Church site lay vacant for two decades until the construction of the Texas State Hotel.

Building
The Texas State Hotel was designed by Joseph Finger, a local architect. The footprint of the sixteen-story, steel-framed building was a C-shape facing both Fannin and Rusk streets. The hotel was owned by Jesse H. Jones.

The Texas State Hotel was originally planned for the 1928 Democratic National Convention, but due to construction and finance difficulties, was not completed until 1929 (with the help of Jesse Holman Jones).

At one point in the 1980s, The University of Texas owned the property and a hotel-management group ran the hotel, but it proved unprofitable and closed.

The Hotel eventually went up for auction in 1987, at which a subsidiary of Texaco had the winning bid of $1.39 million for the property, which was located across the street of their, at the time headquarters at 1111 Rusk. It was left unused until Fannin & Rusk, LP took over the property for redevelopment.

The renovation of the Texas State Hotel won the 2006 Good Brick Awards, given by the Greater Houston Preservation Alliance to honor exceptional preservation projects and the people behind them.  Since it has opened, it has featured a restaurant, Table 7 Bistro, on the bottom floor.

Residences 
The hotel building includes several residences, which have the same amenities as the regular guests

The residences are zoned to the Houston Independent School District (HISD). Residents are zoned to the Gregory-Lincoln Education Center (for grades K-8), and Northside High School (formerly Davis High School). Residents were previously zoned to Bruce Elementary School, and E.O. Smith Education Center (for middle school).

References

External links

 Club Quarters Houston
 Residences Atop Club Quarters

National Register of Historic Places in Houston
Hotel buildings completed in 1929
Skyscraper hotels in Houston
Residential skyscrapers in Houston
Joseph Finger buildings
1929 establishments in Texas
Hotel buildings on the National Register of Historic Places in Texas